A ferryman is the person who operates a ferry. 

Ferryman or The Ferryman may also refer to:
 The Ferryman, an episode of Captain Power and the Soldiers of the Future
 The Ferryman (2007 film), a 2007 New Zealand film
 The Ferryman (2016 film), a film by Jiajia Zhang
 The Ferryman (play), a 2017 play by Jez Butterworth
 "The Ferryman" (song), a folk ballad
 Ferryman gods, such as:
 Aqen, Egyptian god of the dead
 Charon (mythology), mythological Greek ferryman